The radio station that had code WNRB from 1990 to 1994 is now called WYOH.

WNRB-LP (93.3 FM) is a radio station licensed as a low power, community radio station in Wausau, Wisconsin, United States, serving the Greater Wausau area. This designation means they are a non-commercial, non-profit entity offering primarily locally produced programming. All on-air programs are presented by non-paid volunteers. The station is owned by Wausau Area Hmong Mutual Association.

References

External links
 

NRB-LP
NRB-LP